Francis Middleton (6 June 1879 – 1943) was an English footballer who played in the Football League for Derby County and Leicester Fosse.

References

1879 births
1943 deaths
English footballers
Association football forwards
English Football League players
Whitwick White Cross F.C. players
Derby County F.C. players
Leicester City F.C. players